Yu Ying-shih (22 January 1930 – 1 August 2021) was a Chinese-born American historian, sinologist, and the Gordon Wu '58 Professor of Chinese Studies, Emeritus, at Princeton University. He was known for his mastery of sources for Chinese history and philosophy, his ability to synthesize them on a wide range of topics, and for his advocacy for a new Confucianism. He was a tenured professor at Harvard University and Yale University before his time at Princeton.

He was the elder brother of philosopher and educator Paul Yu.

Early life 
Yu's father, who had studied at Harvard, taught history in Tianjin, and at the start of the second Sino-Japanese War sent him to live with his aunt from 1937 through 1946 in rural Anhui province, where they would be safe from Japanese invasion. He later recalled that "although rujia  儒家 [Confucian] culture was in a degenerate state, it nevertheless controlled the activities of daily life: by and large, all interpersonal relationships—from marriage and funeral customs to seasonal festivals—adhered to the rujia norms, supplemented by Buddhist and Daoist beliefs and practices." Wartime shortages meant that sometimes the family had no money for rice, forcing them to eat potatoes. "I hate potatoes," he later told an interviewer. The situation was too chaotic for him to attend school, so he read whatever material he could find, for instance, his aunt's popular novels.

Academic career 
In 1949, he enrolled in the department of History in Yenching University,  but in 1950 came to Hong Kong for reunion with his family. He then studied in the newly founded New Asia College, later incorporated into Chinese University of Hong Kong.  The founders of New Asia College, which Yu joined as a student, were staunchly anti-Communist, rejected the iconoclastic New Culture Movement but did not see Western liberal thought as the alternative. Yu studied with Ch'ien Mu, a scholar rooted in traditional Chinese philosophy, and became the first graduate of the college. He is remembered both as an international prodigy at weiqi and for the number of cigarettes he smoked.

On Ch'ien's recommendation, he came to Harvard University in the United States in 1955, and received his PhD in 1962.  He then taught at various universities including University of Michigan, Harvard, Yale University and Princeton University. As Yale historian Jonathan Spence commented, Yu is one of the few people to have been tenured at these three Ivy League universities.  In 1973, he went back to his alma mater, New Asia College, as its Head of college and also the Pro Vice-Chancellor of University for two years, before returning to Harvard. In 1977, he moved to Yale to take up the position of Charles Seymour Professor in Chinese History. He then moved to Princeton in 1987 to be Professor of East Asian Studies until his retirement.

In 1974, he was elected as a Fellow at Academia Sinica, and has kept this position until his death. In the 1970s, he became one of the members of the school board of New Asia Middle School. When asked later why he had moved to Princeton he said: "They had a really interesting library", probably meaning the East Asian Library and the Gest Collection. He retired from Princeton in 2001.

He died at his home in Princeton, New Jersey during his sleep on 1 August, 2021.

Writing 
While still in Hong Kong, Yu started to write books and pamphlets in Chinese commenting on the problems of intellectuals and democracy in the People's Republic. He was particularly tenacious over the years in presenting the achievements of Chen Yinke (1890–1969), the greatest modern scholar of Tang dynasty China, who was at first supported and then hounded to death by the revolution. His Harvard PhD thesis was published as Trade and Expansion in Han China; a Study in the Structure of Sino-Barbarian Economic Relations (Berkeley: University of California Press,  1967). Scrupulous and thematically relevant monographs, mostly published in Chinese, explored the role of intellectuals, especially early modern moral and political critics such as Fang Yizhi (1611–71), Dai Zhen (1723–77), and Zhang Xuecheng (1738–1801), who had been neglected in earlier scholarship. Yu also mastered the scholarship around Honglou Meng, the novel known in English as Dream of the Red Chamber, a masterpiece exploring the decline of a rich family at the height of the Qing empire in the late 18th century.

The insistent, modest, meticulous voice of history which Yu developed in these studies was the one he used in the debates over democracy in the 1980s and 1990s. Some people, including  both the defenders of the state in Beijing and western modernization liberals, still insisted that democracy and Confucianism were incompatible. But Yu developed the philosophical and historical arguments perhaps implicit in the thought of his mentors: liberal Confucian values, once freed from the imperial ideology of the dynasties, are essential to democracy:  The independent spirit of the scholar both models and creates responsible criticism of politics. Confucian values had always insisted on the critique of political power, moral judgment grounded in historic comparison, the voice of the people in governance, the contingent nature of the political mandate, public discourse, the responsibility of the individual for social action, and could even be developed for a contemporary view of women's rights.

Yu developed a critical view of the revival of Confucianism in mainland China. He commented "the Chinese Communists are not Confucianists."   He held that there were two kinds of Confucianism to be found in China's history: "the Confucianism that had been persecuted, the other is the Confucianism that has persecuted people." He termed the state sponsorship of Confucianism in China today "the kiss of death."

In October 2014 it was reported that Beijing had ordered the banning of works by Yu Yingshi.

Yu gave a televised speech on 22 November 2019 in which he said that some Taiwan media act as the mouthpiece of the PRC in Taiwan.

Prizes and honors 
Yu Ying-shih was elected to the American Philosophical Society in 2004. On 15 November 2006, he was named the third recipient of the John W. Kluge Prize for lifetime achievement in the study of humanity. He shared the 2006 prize with John Hope Franklin. He is the inaugural winner of the Tang Prize in Sinology, which recognizes scholars conducting "revolutionary research" and is selected by the Academia Sinica. Yu used his Tang Prize winnings of NT$10 million to establish the Yu Ying-shih Fellowship for the Humanities. Asteroid 28966 Yuyingshih, discovered by Bill Yeung in 2001, was named in his honor. The official  was published by the Minor Planet Center on 6 April 2019.

Yu received honorary doctorate in arts from the University of Hong Kong in 1992 and honorary doctorate in law from the Chinese University of Hong Kong in 1977.

To honour his contribution to sinology, New Asia College and Chung Chi College have set up the series "Yu Ying-shih Lecture in History" in 2007 to invite distinguished scholars to speak about Chinese history.

Major works 
 Yu Ying-shih WorldCat.
 
 
 
 

 
 :
 Vol 1 史學、史家與時代 (history, historians and their times)
 Vol 2 中國思想傳統及其現代變遷 (Traditional Chinese Thought and its present day transformation)
 Vol 3 儒家倫理與商人精神 (Confucian ethic and the spirit of capitalism)
 Vol 4 中國知識人之史的考察 (Chinese intellectuals and their historical investigations)
 Vol 5 現代學人與學術 (Modern scholars and scholarship)
 Vol 6 民主制度與近代文明 (Democracy and modern civilization)
 Vol 7 文化評論與中國情懷（上） (Cultural critique Pt I)
 Vol 8 文化評論與中國情懷（下） (Cultural critiques Pt II)
 Vol 9 歷史人物考辨 (Historical textual studies)
 Vol 10 宋明理學與政治文化 (Studies in Song and Ming Lixue and political culture)
 . Volume 1 (2016). Sixth century B.C.E. to seventeenth century. Volume 2 (2017) Seventeenth century through twentieth century.

References

Further reading

External links 
 Despotism, market and Confucianism in the age of Wang Yang-ming. Video lecture given by Yu Ying-shih at the Library of Congress in 2005
 Kluge Prize Winner 2006 - Yu Ying-shih
 Address of Yu Ying-shih on the Occasion of Receiving the John W. Kluge Prize at the Library of Congress
  China rediscovers its own history. Video lecture given by Yu Ying-shih at the Library of Congress in 2007
 China's return to tradition: how to interpret the new forces emerging in China. Video lecture given by Yu Ying-shih at the Library of Congress in 2007

1930 births
2021 deaths
Alumni of the Chinese University of Hong Kong
American sinologists
Charter 08 signatories
Chinese emigrants to the United States
Educators from Tianjin
Harvard University alumni
Historians of China
Academic staff of the Chinese University of Hong Kong
Kansai University alumni
Members of Academia Sinica
New Asia College
Princeton University faculty
Taiwanese people from Tianjin
University of Michigan faculty
Writers from Tianjin
Members of the American Philosophical Society